DXVD-TV, channel 12, is a relay television station of Philippine television network ABS-CBN Corporation. Its studios and transmitter are located at Barangay San Agustin Norte, Tandag City.

ABS-CBN TV-12 local programs 
TV Patrol North Mindanao (simulcast over TV-2 Cagayan de Oro)

ABS-CBN TV-12 defunct local programs
TV Patrol Caraga

See also
List of ABS-CBN Corporation channels and stations

ABS-CBN stations
Television stations in Surigao del Sur
Television channels and stations established in 2008